Lake Malone is a  reservoir in Logan, Muhlenberg, and Todd counties in Kentucky. It was impounded from Rocky Creek in 1961 and named for Mr. and Mrs. Wallace C. Malone who donated a large tract of land for the lake.

References

External links
Lake Malone State Park facilities map
Lake Malone State Park interactive GIS map

Infrastructure completed in 1961
Reservoirs in Kentucky
Protected areas of Logan County, Kentucky
Protected areas of Muhlenberg County, Kentucky
Protected areas of Todd County, Kentucky
Bodies of water of Logan County, Kentucky
Bodies of water of Muhlenberg County, Kentucky
Bodies of water of Todd County, Kentucky